Paul Heinrich Söding (born 20 February 1933 in Dresden, Germany) is a German physicist.  He is best known for his work in particle physics and as former director of research of the German particle physics lab DESY.

Career 
Paul Söding studied physics at the universities of Hamburg and Munich in Germany. He was the first doctoral student of Willibald Jentschke in Hamburg.
In 1964 he received his doctorate from the University of Hamburg.  He subsequently did research at the University of California, Berkeley, Cornell University in New York and the European  particle physics research lab CERN.

In 1969 he became senior scientist at the Deutsches Elektronen-Synchrotron (DESY) in Hamburg.  There he and his colleagues at the TASSO detector used the PETRA positron-electron accelerator to observe the first direct evidence of the gluon, the elementary particle that mediates the strong nuclear force.   
For that discovery, he was awarded together with Bjørn Wiik, Günter Wolf, and Sau Lan Wu) with the Prize for High Energy and Particle Physics  of the European Physical Society. As research director at DESY from 1982 till 1991 he contributed to the research program at the HERA accelerator.

His efforts to get the Tetraelectronvolt Energy Superconducting Linear Accelerator (TESLA)  built at DESY weren't successful.  The project was, however, merged into the International Linear Collider (ILC) plans.

After the German reunification in 1990, the former GDR institute for high energy physics at Zeuthen near Berlin was integrated into DESY. Paul Söding became director of this institute in 1991. It is mainly due to his efforts that the Zeuthen institute has gained global recognition. He retired from this position in 1998. 

In 1998 he was granted emeritus status. 

In 2001 his efforts were recognized with the German Federal Cross of Merit (First Class) Medal awarded by the German President. 

As of 2012 he is still active at the Humboldt University of Berlin.

Publications 

He was co-author of the "Review of particle properties" for several years.  He was one of the original members of the "Meson Team" later renamed to the Particle Data Group. He left the team in 1975.  He wrote and co-authored several books in English and German and many papers on particle physics.

External links
Scientific publications of Paul Söding on INSPIRE-HEP

References 

1933 births
Living people
20th-century German physicists
Scientists from Dresden
Recipients of the Cross of the Order of Merit of the Federal Republic of Germany
People associated with CERN
Fellows of the American Physical Society
21st-century German physicists
University of Hamburg alumni
Ludwig Maximilian University of Munich alumni